Sehlem refers to the following places in Germany:

 Sehlem, Lower Saxony
 Sehlem, Rhineland-Palatinate